The Harley-Davidson Street motorcycle series was announced by Harley-Davidson at the 2013 EICMA show in Milan for 2014 introduction, Harley's first all-new models in 13 years, including Harley's first lightweight motorcycle since the 1974 Sprint. The 750 is powered by a 749 cc displacement version of Harley's 60° SOHC V-twin, water-cooled Revolution engine dubbed the Revolution X. The Street 500 has a 494 cc engine with a smaller bore but is otherwise identical. Production for sale in the United States and Canada is done at Harley's Kansas City facility; production for the rest of the world, including engines, is done at the Harley-Davidson India subsidiary in Bawal with indigenous components. Street series bikes are positioned as Harley's entry-level models, with a price point that is the lowest for Harley's US lineup by over $1,200.

Harley-Davidson Street Rod

For 2017, Harley released the Street Rod based on the 750 Street model. This new model introduced new features such as higher output Revolution X engine  @ 8,750 rpm and  @ 4,000 rpm, 43 mm inverted front forks and piggyback reservoir rear shocks, drag-style bars and 17 inch wheels. The new model, responding to market feedback that demanded a sporty standard, was meant to compete with bikes like the Yamaha FZ-07 and FZ-09.

Riders Edge Program
The Street 500 replaced the Buell Blast in Harley-Davidson's rider training program.

Reactions
Speculation about Harley "outsourcing" production of 500 and 750 cc models (called small-displacement in US press) to India began at least as early as 2011, along with harsh criticism that by not offering smaller bikes there, Harley "doesn't understand emerging markets".

The New York Times also opined that Harley's move towards medium-displacement echoed that of other manufacturers for the developing world.

References
Citations

Sources

External links

Cruiser motorcycles
Street
Motorcycles of India
Motorcycles introduced in 2014